Welford Park railway station was a railway station in Welford, Berkshire, UK, on the Lambourn Valley Railway.

History 
The station opened on 2 April 1898. It was rebuilt by the Great Western Railway in 1908, providing a second platform, a signal box, and a passing loop.

The station had few passenger facilities, and dealt primarily with small goods, including coal, watercress, and timber.

Passenger services ceased from 4 January 1960 and the station closed to all traffic on 19 July 1965. The line was retained to serve a  spur line which ran from the station to RAF Welford. until closure in 1972. The last trains were a special passenger service from Newbury which ran on 3 November 1973

References 

Lambourn Valley Railway
Disused railway stations in Berkshire
Former Great Western Railway stations
Railway stations in Great Britain opened in 1898
Railway stations in Great Britain closed in 1960
Welford, Berkshire